Social media played an important role in shaping the course of events leading up to, during, and after the 2016 United States presidential election. It enabled people to have a greater interaction with the political climate, controversies, and news surrounding the candidates. Unlike traditional news platforms, such as newspapers, radio, and magazines, social media gave people the ability to comment below a candidate's advertisement, news surrounding the candidates, or articles regarding the policy of the candidates. It also allowed people to formulate their own opinions on public forums and sites and allowed for greater interaction among voters. The accessibility of information online enabled more voters to educate themselves on candidates' positions on issues, which in turn enabled them to form unique opinions on candidates and vote on those opinions, ultimately impacting the election's outcome.

Most candidates made use of multiple social media accounts on various platforms, such as YouTube, Facebook, Twitter, Instagram, and Snapchat. Depending on the digital architecture of each platform, candidates would use a variety of techniques to discredit their opponent, and gain support. In turn, users could share, like, or comment on these actions, furthering the candidates' outreach. By doing so, candidates and users both would influence or change people's views on a specific issue.

Following the election, Facebook and Cambridge Analytica initiated an investigation into the harvesting and use of personal data on social media for political advertising, which ultimately resulted in the liquidation of Cambridge Analytica and the testification of Facebook's CEO Mark Zuckerberg in front of Congress. A separate investigation into the Russian interference in the election was also conducted, and concluded with the observation that Russian intelligence agencies created fake social media accounts and bought ads on multiple social media sites in order to influence the election in favor of the eventual winner Donald Trump. This in turn prompted a global debate over dissemination of fake news over the Internet, with many social media sites adopting new policies regarding the issue for the 2020 election.

Background
As the campaign began, analysts assumed that, because of the increased reach and capacity of social media sites of all kinds since the last election cycle, social media would be used in potentially powerful new ways. The Wall Street Journal predicted that the use of campaign advertisements targeted at individuals using newly available data would be among the more notable innovations. The political newspaper, The Hill, concluded not only that "[s]ocial media's influence in this presidential election is stronger than it has ever been," but that it "will shape campaigns for years to come." According to The Wall Street Journal, the "traditional media" and the Democratic and Republican parties have lost "dominance" of public opinion to the "digital revolution."

Frank Speiser, the co-founder of SocialFlow, stated, "This is the first true social media election." He added that, before the 2016 presidential primaries, social media was an "auxiliary method of communication. But now [candidates] can put messages out there and get folks on social media to act on your behalf by just sharing it around. You don't have to buy access to reach millions of people anymore."" According to Republican political strategist Patrick Ruffini, in the 2012 election cycle, candidates would use social media to make short statements, and re-tweet or thank followers. The candidates were able to use social media to get free advertising from their supporters.

Main campaigns

Donald Trump campaign

The Trump campaign made extensive use of social media platforms, notably Twitter, to reach voters. Unlike other candidates, Trump's Twitter and Facebook posts linked to news media rather than the campaign site as part of his strategy to emphasize media appearance over volunteers and donations. Based on the data gathered by the Pew Research Center, 78% of his retweets were from the general public, as opposed to news outlets and government officials. Trump's unique use of social media compared to other candidates garnered critical attention, as he harnessed Twitter as a platform to respond quickly to his opponents and tweet about his stance on various issues. Before being named as the official party candidate at the 2016 Republican National Convention, many of his tweets directly attacked his fellow Republican candidates when their poll numbers would rise. Trump frequently utilized Twitter both during and after the 2016 presidential election, explaining that social media helped him win the primary and general elections, even though his opponents spent "much more money than [he] spent". While Slate explains that Trump succeeded because he retained his "vulgar vigor and translated it into the political arena", the Washington Post has called his Twitter account "prolific, populist, and self-obsessed". After winning the election, Trump continued to post on Twitter throughout his presidency, until his personal Twitter account was suspended "due to the risk of further incitement of violence" on January 9, 2021, in light of the U.S. Capitol attack.

The Trump presidential campaign also benefited from large numbers of supporters who were active on social media from the beginning of the campaign. In the first Republican Presidential debate, held on August 6, 2015, the moderator asked candidate Jeb Bush if he stood by a statement made the previous April that illegal entry into the U.S. by undocumented migrants is "an act of love", to which Bush replied that he did. Almost immediately thereafter, the Trump campaign posted his comment as part of a video showing mugshots of illegal immigrants who committed violent crimes in the US, intercut with footage of Bush using the phrase.  According to Eric Fehrnstrom, political analyst and media strategist, the video marked a crucial turning point in the campaign for the Republican nomination. Political analyst Michael Barone regarded the ad as a key moment in Trump's political rise. The San Francisco Chronicle described the ad as pivotal in transforming Instagram from a personal photo-sharing app that some celebrities and politicians used to enhance their images, into a propaganda tool.

Supporters of Donald Trump and opponents of Hillary Clinton conducted an Internet campaign between June 2015 and November 2016 in an effort to sway the election. During this time period, users of social media, especially Reddit and 4chan, conducted numerous "operations" to sway public opinion using Internet memes, Internet posts and online media. The Internet conflict that arose from this campaign has been dubbed by some as "The Great Meme War".

On Reddit, r/The Donald was a pro-Trump subforum (termed a subreddit on Reddit) that ranked consistently as the most active on the site. Due to the very active community and the algorithm that dictated what content reached the "r/all" default page of the website, a significant portion of the r/all page was content from r/The_Donald. In response, Reddit made changes to its algorithms on June 15 in an attempt to preserve variety of r/all. On July 27, 2016, Trump participated in an Ask Me Anything (AMA) on r/The_Donald, answering thirteen questions from his supporters. r/The_Donald was more active and had a higher subscriber count than the subreddit for Hillary Clinton, r/HillaryClinton, until the former was shut down by Reddit in 2020 for repeated breaches of policy.

Hillary Clinton campaign

Hillary Clinton's campaign team used already established social media strategies and tactics that the candidate had used in previous elections to help boost her popularity in the 2016 election. None of the other candidates had recently run for president, inevitably making the tactic unique to Clinton.  A Pew Research study showed that 80% of Clinton's posts included links to her website or campaign pages, while 78% of Trump's posts included links to news media. It was also found that on Facebook, Clinton linked to her campaign 60% of the time, and the news media a quarter of the time. The Clinton campaign used social media to advertise Trump's use of fake news and potential Russian intervention. Many argue that Clinton's loss was in part due to Trump gaining the votes of groups that do not use social media, while Clinton's audience was active on most social media platforms.

In August 2015, Clinton was involved in a dispute with Jeb Bush. Bush copied one of Clinton's Twitter graphics that discussed student debt. Clinton responded by crossing out the words on Bush's graphic and stating "F: The grade to Florida for college affordability under Jeb Bush’s leadership." with the caption "@JebBush Fixed it for you." Bush responded with a graphic of his own that used Clinton's logo to criticize the growing tax rate. In this incident, Clinton and Bush used popular social media trends to capture their target audience and grow their social media presence, such as publicly arguing online (often termed "having beef" on social media).

In April 2016, Correct the Record, a pro-Clinton super PAC, announced a program called "Barrier Breakers" intended to rival the largely online volunteer efforts of Sanders and Trump supporters. With $1 million in funding, Correct the Record employed paid staff described as "former reporters, bloggers, public affairs specialists, designers" to respond to negative content about Clinton.

On June 9, 2016, as a response to Donald Trump's tweet regarding Obama's endorsement to Clinton, she wrote with a three-word tweet: "Delete your account"; it became her most retweeted tweet of all time. After the Democratic National Convention, Clinton began campaigning with running mate, Tim Kaine, and while on the campaign trail, she stated, "I don't know who created Pokémon Go [...] I try to get them to have Pokémon Go to the polls".

Clinton used social media platform Snapchat to chronicle her campaign across America. One of her videos, where she proclaimed that she was, "Just chillin', in Cedar Rapids", quickly became a meme on video-sharing app Vine, gaining over 17 million plays in a month.

Ted Cruz campaign

According to The Guardian, Cruz was "skewered by social media memes". His run for the Presidency was ended by a series of memes, including a viral video of a failed attempt to shake hands with his running mate Carly Fiorina, which was edited to draw attention towards Cruz's awkwardness. The video was viewed 3.5 million times online. In addition, a mock-conspiracy theory faux-asserted that Cruz was the Zodiac Killer, an unidentified serial killer active in northern California from the late 1960s to the early 1970s, largely before Cruz was even born.

Bernie Sanders campaign

Social media is widely acknowledged to have played a crucial role in the Bernie Sanders presidential campaign. His large spending on Facebook and Instagram ads attracted a large following of young voters and online advertising also bolstered his campaign by raising nearly $230 million. Sanders supporters succeeded in closing down a planned Trump rally in Chicago in March 2016 and did so through Facebook organizing efforts. As of May 2016, 450,000 people belonged to the Facebook group Bernie Sanders' Dank Meme Stash, one of the several online groups supporting Sanders. The group was primarily devoted to praising Bernie whilst pointing out flaws in rival candidates Ted Cruz, Donald Trump, and Hillary Clinton in comical ways. "Bernie or Hillary?", or "Bernie vs. Hillary", was an Internet meme made popular during the 2016 Democratic Party presidential nomination in the United States 2016 presidential election in which Internet users who mostly favored Bernie Sanders over Hillary Clinton compared the two candidates in faux political posters, with Sanders being portrayed as over-enthusiastic and Clinton being shown as more clueless. The meme also received criticism for its gender stereotypes, having portrayed Clinton as stiff and unable to be funny. Similar memes comparing presidential candidates to each other continued to be posted throughout the election, on a variety of social media platforms.

Other candidates

Gary Johnson campaign
The humorous "Balanced Rebellion" video, in which "Dead Abe Lincoln" endorses Johnson, the Libertarian Party nominee for president, was the most widely viewed viral video of any candidate the 2016 campaign, receiving more than 18 million views and 420,000 shares within two weeks of its upload. The advertisement shows the many negative aspects of both Hillary and Trump, and states that Johnson will protect our freedoms. Another video that made headlines shows the former New Mexico governor faking a heart attack during a debate on the legalization of marijuana. As a third-party candidate, one of Johnson's main focuses was to convince dissatisfied Republicans and Democrats to vote for him. He received a 5,000 percent increase in Google searches when Ted Cruz dropped out of the race for the Republican presidential nomination. One way to attract more voters was to go to the Democratic National Convention to persuade disheartened Bernie Sanders supporters to vote for him. This method proved to be somewhat effective, as Johnson had a surge in online interactions about the former Governor during the two days of the convention, July 26 and 27.

Jill Stein campaign 

Jill Stein, the Green Party nominee for president, made extensive use of Twitter for her presidential campaign. She used the social media platform to communicate with Americans before, during, and after the presidential debate at Hofstra University, and in hope that it would demonstrate a "changing political landscape" where voters were faced with more than two options for president. Stein was trending for the first time on Twitter the week of July 20, 2016, and gained 27,000 new followers. She also followed Gary Johnson in an attempt to sway discouraged Bernie Sanders supporters to vote for her in the election, which led to a boost in online conversation about her during the DNC, as it had done with Johnson previously. After the end of the election, Stein requested a recount in Wisconsin, which she funded by raising money using her social media influence. She also raised money for recounts in Pennsylvania and Michigan, stating that the reason for the recounts was to assure that no hacking of voting machines or voter results occurred.

Impact 
Each candidate used a combination of social media platforms and advertising techniques to influence the portrayal of themselves within the news and general media. These techniques included posting, re-posting, creating support videos, linking to news articles, and criticizing other candidates via fact-checking, discrediting, and response. This also helped them create a unique style of communication with the public and build electoral coalitions, which identified voters and, in turn, raised money. As a result, social media ultimately aided in voter mobilization and electoral impact.

Social media also became a primary source of news for some demographics. A study conducted by the Pew Research Center discovered that 35% of voters between the ages of 18 and 29 used social media as their primary source of news, making it the most popular news source among their generation. Social media was overall the second most popular source of news during the election, with 14% of all voters listing it as their main source of news.

Additionally, peer pressure was seen as a large factor in some people's vote. Individuals publicly voicing support for candidates were seen to put pressure on their friends and family to hold the same opinions, and in some instances forced others to hold the same views.

The Guardian compared Internet memes to political cartoons, arguing, "For the first time in a US election cycle, community-generated memes have grown to play a significant role in political discourse, similar to the classic printed cartoon." While an Internet meme is unlikely to destroy a political career, many memes targeting a candidate might.

Social media was the largest outlet for misinformation. Throughout the election, Russian intelligence agencies made use of multiple social media accounts to disseminate false news, primarily targeted against Democratic nominee Hillary Clinton. In a testimony in front of the United States Congress, Facebook estimated that the false news reached over 126 million voters, and had a significant impact on the electoral outcome. 29 million people were reported to have seen the original posts, but comments, likes, and shares helped the information reach an additional 97 million people.

Post-election investigations 
After the elections, two separate investigations were conducted into the misuse of personal data by Cambridge Analytica and alleged Russian interference in the election. In both instances, the investigations were primarily focused on the use of social media and personal data.

Facebook-Cambridge Analytica data scandal 

In March 2018, an anonymous whistleblower (later revealed to be former Cambridge Analytica employee Christopher Wylie) revealed to the press that during the 2016 election, Cambridge Analytica used a misleading app to collect personal information on users' and their friends' Facebook profiles without their consent. The information collected was subsequently used to build data profiles on users, which were then used for targeted political advertising. Although only 270,000 people downloaded the app, it is estimated that over 50 million Facebook users were affected, due to the large number of likes and reposts that some ads received. This social media strategy was used in the presidential campaigns of Donald Trump and Ted Cruz during the 2016 election.

The scandal eventually resulted in the testification of Facebook CEO Mark Zuckerberg and whistleblower Christopher Wylie in front of Congress, the liquidation of Cambridge Analytica as well as a fine of $5 billion for Facebook. It also provoked a global debate about the ethics surrounding data harvesting and privacy, especially in political contexts. In April 2018, Twitter adopted new a data privacy policy with greater emphasis on giving users control of what data they share with the company. Facebook also announced new a new data privacy policy the same month.

Investigation into Russian interference in the election 

Throughout the 2016 election, the Internet Research Agency attempted to influence the electoral outcome in favor of Donald Trump by creating large numbers of social media accounts to like, share and repost positive information on Trump and negative information on Clinton.

Russian computer hacks also infiltrated the information systems of the Democratic National Committee and the Democratic Congressional Campaign Committee, and posted the files obtained on a number of websites such as DCLeaks, Guccifer 2.0 and WikiLeaks.

In May 2017, a Special Counsel investigation was conducted by Robert Mueller, which ultimately concluded in its final report that the Russian interference violated U.S. criminal law and the integrity of the election in favor of Republican candidate Donald Trump.

See also
 Fake news website
 Mueller Report
 Russian interference in the 2016 United States elections
 Social media and political communication in the United States
 Social media in politics
 Donald Trump on social media
 Ted Cruz–Zodiac meme

References

Further reading

Hari Kunzru, For the Lulz, March 26, 2020 issue of The New York Review of Books review of Dale Beran's It Came from Something Awful: How a Toxic Troll Army Accidentally Memed Donald Trump Into Office

2016 United States presidential election in popular culture
Donald Trump and social media
Political communication
Politics of the United States